"Sweet Spot" is a song by German singer Kim Petras from her debut album Clarity (2019). It was released as the fourth promotional single from the album on May 13, 2019, by BunHead Records. Petras released this song among others from the same album in preparation for her North American tour.

Reception
Rolling Stone commented on how the track had the potential to be the song of the summer, while multiple music critics and journalists, such as Jordan Miller of BreatheHeavy, Jeremy Helligar of Variety, and Nick Levine of NME compared the track to Kylie Minogue's works, including her albums Light Years and Fever.

Track listing
 
 "Sweet Spot" – 3:14

Credits and personnel
 Written by Kim Petras, Lukasz Gottwald, Aaron Joseph, Theron Thomas and Vaughn Oliver
 Produced by Made in China, Aaron Joseph and Vaughn Oliver
 Vocals by Kim Petras

Release history

References

2019 singles
2019 songs
Kim Petras songs
Song recordings produced by Dr. Luke
Songs written by Dr. Luke
Songs written by Theron Thomas
Songs written by Kim Petras